Sky Aviation was a regional airline based in Jakarta, Indonesia. It started service in 2010 and suspended operation in 2014.

History 
Sky Aviation was established as an air charter service in 2010 with a fleet of two Cirrus aircraft. After a management change in 2010, it expanded its services to a regular scheduled airline.

In 2010 Sky Aviation acquired a Cessna Grand Caravan to service scheduled flights between Surabaya, Banyuwangi and Denpasar. These routes were officially launched in Banyuwangi on December 29, 2010.

In the first quarter of 2011 Sky Aviation acquired Fokker 50 turbo props as new type of fleet. Three Fokker 50 aircraft joined its fleet and entered into service.

On March 29, 2012 Sky Aviation launched its first international route with a turboprop-powered Fokker F-50 airplane to serve Raja Haji Fisabilillah Airport, Tanjung Pinang, Riau Islands to Melaka (Malacca), Malaysia.

On August 7, 2012, Sky Aviation commenced Boeing 737-300 services flying scheduled flights between Jakarta and Pekanbaru.
. The airline also began providing full meal-service aboard its aircraft in collaboration with BreadTalk.

The airline took delivery of the first of 12 Sukhoi Superjet 100 it had ordered, making it the first airline in Indonesia to operate the type.

On March 19, 2014 the Indonesian Transportation and Communication Ministry Tifatul Sembiring confirmed that Sky Aviation would be temporarily suspending its operations effective immediately. The company was reportedly seeking a cash injection from new investors, with a plan to resume operations by March 31, 2014. Sky Aviation requested a third extension of their temporary suspension, but as regulations permitted only two, the Transportation Ministry allocated its routes to other airlines beginning 5 May 2014. On July 22, 2014, it was announced that Sky Aviation was due to resume services after all negotiations had been settled, but as of May 2017, the company remained suspended, and the airline fleet was still in storage.

Destinations

Indonesia

Java 
Surabaya, Juanda International Airport

Sumatra 
 Batam, Hang Nadim Airport, hub
 Pekanbaru, Sultan Syarif Kasim II Airport, hub
 Dumai, Pinang Kampai Airport
 Matak, Matak Airport
 Tanjung Pinang, Raja Haji Fisabilillah Airport
 Natuna, Ranai Airport
 Palembang, Sultan Mahmud Badaruddin II International Airport
 Tanjung Pandan, H.A.S. Hanandjoeddin Airport
 Pangkal Pinang, Depati Amir Airport
 Siborong-Borong, Silangit Airport
 Sibolga, Ferdinand Lumban Tobing Airport
 Gunung Sitoli, Binaka Airport
 Bandar Lampung, Radin Inten II Airport

Kalimantan 
 Pontianak, Supadio Airport

Sulawesi 
 Makassar, Sultan Hasanuddin International Airport

Bali and Nusa Tenggara 
 Bali, Ngurah Rai International Airport
 Lombok, Lombok International Airport
 Labuan Bajo, Komodo Airport
 Ende, H. Hasan Aroeboesman Airport
 Kupang, El Tari Airport

Papua 
 Sorong, Sorong Airport
 Jayapura, Sentani Airport

Malaysia 
 Malacca, Malacca International Airport

Fleet 

As of December 2013, the Sky Aviation fleet includes the following aircraft:

The Sky Aviation fleet is currently in storage pending resumption of operations.

Accidents and incidents 

On August 27, 2012, a Fokker 50 registration PK-ECD performing flight SYA350 from Tanjungpinang to Natuna (Indonesia) with 44 people on board overran the end of runway 18 while landing in Natuna during heavy rain and reduced visibility conditions at about 11:15L (04:15Z). The aircraft came to a stop with all gear on soft ground with the main gear a few meters past the paved surface. There were no injuries on board, and the aircraft sustained only minor damage.

References

External links 
 Sky Aviation Launches Pekanbaru-Melaka Service

Defunct airlines of Indonesia
Airlines established in 2010
Airlines formerly banned in the European Union
2014 disestablishments in Indonesia
Indonesian companies established in 2010